MYAirline is a low cost carrier based in Malaysia founded in 2021. It is headquartered in Subang Jaya, Selangor and primarily operates from KLIA2, the low-cost carrier terminal of Kuala Lumpur International Airport. The airline began its maiden flight on 1 December 2022 to Kuching International Airport.

History

Origin
The airline traces its origin from a discussion between Rayner Teo Kheng Hock, an airline industry veteran, and a Malaysian entrepreneur, Dato' Goh Hwan Hua in late 2020. The team identified that the post-pandemic travel recovery would establish a good potential to build a new airline, including a lower price rate for aircraft leases, as well as the surplus of airport slots and skilled aviation-related professionals. MYAirline was founded on 11 January 2021; and on October 28, 2021, the company's legal name was changed to Z9 Elite Sdn. Bhd.

On July 2022, the airline received its first aircraft, an Airbus A320 (9M-DAC) leased from Aircastle Limited. MYAirline's fleet was further developed by the arrival of its second (9M-DAB) and third aircraft (9M-DAG) on September and October 2022. The airline was granted its Air Operator Certificate on 27 September 2022 from the Civil Aviation Authority of Malaysia, as well as its Air Service License on 15th November 2022 from Malaysian Aviation Commission (MAVCOM). The license awarded enables MYAirline to operate passenger and cargo services.

The airline was initially rumoured to positioned itself as the nation's first ultra low cost carrier. However, on 5 October 2022, it was clarified by the airline's CEO, Rayner Teo that the carrier will performed as a low cost carrier.

Launch

The bookings for MyAirline was launched in 25 November 2022 and the scheduled flights for the carrier commenced on 1 December 2022. The carrier, with a fleet of 3 Airbus A320 operated its inaugural service from Kuala Lumpur International Airport to Kuching, Kota Kinabalu and Langkawi. 

During its initial operations, the airline recorded a high passenger load factor, with routes to Kuching and Kota Kinabalu gained an above 80% load factor and about 70% for Langkawi. There are also some flights that captured 100% capacity, with an average of 75% load factor throughout its network. The carrier offered a once-daily flight to Kuching and twice fights per-day to Kota Kinabalu and Langkawi. By 2 December 2022, the flights to Kuching was increased to twice-daily. A third-daily flight was added to Kota Kinabalu and Kuching from 27 December 2022 onwards.

On 5 December 2022, MYAirline officially introduced routes to Kota Bharu, Penang and Sibu on its network. The flight was commenced on 10 December 2022 for Kota Bharu, followed by Penang by 23 December and 18 January 2023 for Sibu. The operations to Kota Bharu and Sibu are conducted on a twice-daily basis, while Penang has started on a single-daily flight, before being increased to twice flights per-day from 7 January 2023.

The company's domestic route development was continued on 16 December 2022, following MYAirline's announcement to inaugurate two new destinations to Tawau and Miri. The flights to Tawau has been commenced on 21 January 2023, with a single-daily basis; while the flights to Miri will began on 1 March 2023 with one flight per-day before being increased to twice-daily flight from 15 March 2023.

MYAirline's plan to serve Alor Setar and Terengganu will be initiated after the airline received the regulatory approvals.  While its international expansion to  Singapore, Thailand, Indonesia and Vietnam was originally planned to be operated by March 2023. The carrier is projected to fly on destinations located within a four-hour flight radius from its origin, optimum for the low-cost carrier operations.

On 5 January 2023, the airline welcomed its 100,000th passenger, as well as logging over 600 flights across its network. Both milestones were achieved about a month after its inauguration on 1 December 2022.

From April 2023, MyAirline is introducing the Kota Kinabalu-Tawau flight on its network, becoming the first scheduled sector in the company to be operated outside Kuala Lumpur International Airport. The month also witnessed additional frequencies from Kuala Lumpur to both Sabahan cities, with  Kuala Lumpur-Kota Kinabalu flight is being increased to four-daily operations and two-daily flights from Kuala Lumpur to Tawau. According to the MyAirline's CEO, Rayner Teo, the carrier has recorded more than half of its passengers flying towards East Malaysia and it is expected that the percentage will be increased within the next few months.

Corporate affairs and identity

Headquarter
MYAirline established its headquarter in Subang Jaya, Selangor.

Ownership and structure
The airline is 88% owned by Zillion Wealth Bhd, Trillion Cove Holdings Bhd 10% and CEO Rayner Teo Kheng Hock 2%. Additionally, as Dato' Goh Hwan Hua is a shareholder of both Zillion Wealth and Trillion Cove, he maintains a 98% stake of MYAirline. Other directors of the company include Datuk Abd Hamid Mohd Ali, Datuk Seri Azharuddin Abdul, Jothi Prakash Murugan and Rayner Teo Kheng Hock.

Branding
MYAirline introduced a red colour scheme with grey stripes progressed towards the aircraft's front fuselage, while its logo is painted on the vertical stabilizer. Initially, the company has experimented various other alternative colours, with the emphasis to avoid red, blue, orange and purple. However, it finally concluded that red is the most attractive palate to be donned on the aircraft.

Destinations 
As of March 2023, MYAirline route system spans a network mainly originated from its home base in Kuala Lumpur International Airport:

Fleet

Airbus A320-200
MYAirline currently utilises an all Airbus A320 fleet. The carrier maintains that the usage of a single-type of narrow-body aircraft is suitable to accommodate their low-cost airline module. It was held that by handling a common fleet, the crew would develop an expertise on the type of aircraft. Thus, resulting a lower turnaround time, as well as a high utilization rate and a low unit cost. 

At present, its aircraft are leased from several sources, including Aircastle Limited and Genesis Lease. Within the next 5 years, the airline aims to incorporate 50 aircraft in its fleet network.

References

External links

MYAirline
Airlines of Malaysia
Kuala Lumpur International Airport
Malaysian brands
2021 establishments in Malaysia